José Pedro Damiani (October 10, 1921 – August 25, 2007) was an Uruguayan politician and accountant.  He was the Uruguayan president of the "Club Atlético Peñarol".

1921 births
2007 deaths
People from Montevideo
University of the Republic (Uruguay) alumni
Uruguayan accountants
Colorado Party (Uruguay) politicians
Uruguayan football chairmen and investors
Burials at Cementerio del Buceo, Montevideo